Langvatnet is a lake that lies in the municipality of Gildeskål in Nordland county, Norway. It sits directly southwest of the large lake Sokumvatnet. The lake is partially supplied by discharge from the Langvann Hydroelectric Power Station and serves as a reservoir for the Sundsfjord Hydroelectric Power Station.

See also
 List of lakes in Norway
 Geography of Norway

References

Gildeskål
Lakes of Nordland